Kiryat Shmona Municipal Stadium is a football stadium in Kiryat Shmona in northern Israel. It is home to Hapoel Ironi Kiryat Shmona

History
Opened in 1989, the stadium has undergone extensive renovations as the club has climbed from the regional leagues to the Premier League. New plastic seats replaced concrete ones, the pitch was relaid, broadcast facilities built and floodlights erected.

References

Football venues in Israel
Hapoel Ironi Kiryat Shmona F.C.
Sports venues completed in 1989
Buildings and structures in Northern District (Israel)